Andrew Frederick Wissemann (June 9, 1928 – August 20, 2014) was the sixth bishop of the Episcopal Diocese of Western Massachusetts 1984 to 1992. He was a graduate of Wesleyan University and Union Theological Seminary, New York.

Early life and education
Wissemann was born on June 9, 1928, in New York City and raised in Hartsdale, New York. He was educated at White Plains High School and Wesleyan University before commencing theological studies at the Union Theological Seminary. He continued his studies at General Theological Seminary and graduated with a Bachelor of Sacred Theology in 1953. That same year he married Nancy Whittemore, daughter of the Bishop of Western Michigan Lewis Bliss Whittemore.

Ordination
Wissemann was ordained deacon on May 31, 1953, and served as curate of Christ Church in Greenwich, Connecticut. He was ordained priest in December 1953. He was appointed rector of Christ Church in Unionville, Connecticut and later rector of St James’ in Greenfield, Massachusetts between 1960 and 1968, and finally rector of St Stephen's Church in Pittsfield, Massachusetts between 1968 and 1983.

Bishop
Wissemann was elected Bishop of Western Massachusetts in December 1983 and was consecrated on April 7, 1984, by the Presiding Bishop John Allin. He remained in that position until 1992 when he retired. He was well renowned for his pastoral style with which he led the diocese. Wissemann died on August 20, 2014, in Longmeadow, Massachusetts.

External links
Obituary from Episcopal News Service
Diocesan press release

1928 births
2014 deaths
20th-century Anglican bishops in the United States
Clergy from New York City
People from Hartsdale, New York
Wesleyan University alumni
Union Theological Seminary (New York City) alumni
Episcopal bishops of Western Massachusetts